The Soyana is a river in Primorsky and Mezensky Districts of Arkhangelsk Oblast in Russia. It is a left tributary of the Kuloy. The main tributaries of the Soyana are the Nyrzanga (right) and the Telsa (left).

The Soyana collects the drain of the plateau on the eastern side of the Dvina Bay of the White Sea (known as White Sea - Kuloy Plateau). The river originates at the confluence of the Kepina and the Kotuga, and the Kotuga is the lower course of the Pochuga and the Yelovitsa, connected with them via a system of lakes. From the confluence, the river flows north-east.

The Soyana is navigable between the village of Soyana and the Kuloy River.

References

External links

Rivers of Arkhangelsk Oblast
Tributaries of the Kuloy